Buskerud Folk High School is a secular folk high school located in Darbu, Øvre Eiker municipality, Viken county, Norway. It identifies itself as an art and culture school, and admits about 90 students every year. It is owned by the Buskerud school association, and its current principal is Grete Strømsøyen.

It was founded on 8 October 1909. Former principals include Arild Mikkelsen and Aslak Torjusson from 1936 to 1952.

Special courses taught include:
Film and animation
Creative Gaming
eSport
Writing
Rock & metal
Cartoons

References

External links
Official website

Education in Viken (county)
Folk high schools in Norway
Øvre Eiker
Educational institutions established in 1909
1909 establishments in Norway